Szlamica ( - Shlyamitsa) is a river of Poland and Belarus, a tributary of the Marycha. It branches off the Czarna Hańcza near Rygol, northeastern Poland, flows through the lakes Głębokie and Szlamy and crosses the Belarusian border. It flows into the Marycha near the village Kalety, Grodno District.

Rivers of Grodno Region
Rivers of Poland
Rivers of Podlaskie Voivodeship
Rivers of Belarus